Caymanabyssia spina is a species of small sea snail, a marine gastropod mollusk in the family Caymanabyssiidae, the false limpets.

Description 
The maximum recorded shell length is 3 mm.

Habitat 
Minimum recorded depth is 6760 m. Maximum recorded depth is 7225 m.

References

External links

Caymanabyssiidae
Gastropods described in 1976